Frederick David McCarthy (13 August 1905 – 18 November 1997) was an Australian anthropologist and archaeologist. He worked at the Australian Museum in Sydney and was Foundation Principal of the Australian Institute of Aboriginal Studies, with interests covering Australian archaeology, museology and Aboriginal rock art.

Life and career
McCarthy was one of a pair of identical twins born to an English-Scottish immigrant couple, at Crystal Street in Petersham in 1906.

In 1920, at the age of 14, he started work at the Australian Museum as a library clerk; his neighbour, Lucas, worked at the Museum as a carpenter and told him about the position. In 1930, he moved to a position in the Department of Birds and Reptile. Within 12 years of starting at the museum he rose to be Curator of Ethnology, a position he held until 1964, when he was appointed foundational principal of the Australian Institute of Aboriginal Studies. Lacking formal qualifications he then undertook a degree in anthropology at the University of Sydney in 1933 under A. P. Elkin. He graduated with a thesis entitled The material culture of eastern Australia, a study of factors entering into its composition.

McCarthy married a co-worker, Elsie Bramell in 1940. She was forced to resign her position at the Australian Museum as part of a policy not to allow couples to work together in the same department, resulting in the anthropology department being reduced to one person, her position not being replaced until 1961. She continued to assist in McCarthy's fieldwork. Fred and Elsie were the first professionally trained anthropologists and archaeologists in any museum in Australia. In 1941 McCarthy was promoted to First Class Scientific Assistant and then appointed as  curator of the anthropological collections.

In private life, McCarthy was a keen sportsman and bushwalker. He retired in 1971 and was awarded an Honorary Doctorate of Sciences from the Australian National University in recognition of his achievements.

Work
In the underfinanced years of the depression McCarthy undertook, together with a volunteer team he organized, to survey at his own expense, and in his free time, numerous prehistoric art galleries, recording and sketching their contents before urban sprawl destroyed extensive remains of Sydney's aboriginal heritage. They would train over the weekends to areas like the Hawkesbury River, around Cowan, Berowra, Mangrove Creek and the Georges River. This resulted in the compilation of a massive manuscript on Sydney's regional indigenous art which, together with his diaries, he left to AIATSIS after his retirement.

McCarty's diaries of his visit to Indonesia in 1937-8 and the 3rd Congress of Prehistorians of the Far East, in Singapore are held by the AIATSIS Library.

Recognition of his achievements in both anthropology and archaeology led to an invitation in 1948 to participate in the 1948 American-Australian Scientific Expedition to Arnhem Land. His work with Margaret McArthur at Oenpelli (present-day Gunbalanya) was to lead to a groundbreaking study on time factors in aboriginal women's quest for food. A further opportunity for fieldwork came up in 1958 when he obtained a Wenner-Gren Foundation grant to pursue research on aboriginal art in north western Australia. In 1961 he went to the Cape York Peninsula and studied Aboriginal clan dancing at Aurukun. His assiduous investigations resulted in the close description of some 43 totemic dancing events in two large volumes, and the collection of an important number of ornaments used in them.

In 1957 he published one of the first thorough treatises on Australian aborigines, Australia's Aborigines, their life and culture.

Publications
McCarthy's output of papers was extensive. He published some 300 articles and books between 1933 and 1988. Books include:
 F. D. McCarthy, Australian Aboriginal Decorative Art, (1938)
 F. D. McCarthy, Elsie McCarthy, H.V.V. Noone The Stone Implements of Australia (1946): a standard text for aboriginal stone tools for many decades.
 F. D. McCarthy, Australian Aboriginal Rock Art. (1958)

At his death, he left, unpublished a 900-page manuscript entitled Artists of the sandstone, an ethnographical study of contact with whites in Sydney in 1788.

Awards 
He was awarded an honorary Doctor of Science degree from the Australian National University.

Notes

References

Bibliography

External links
Australian Archaeological Association obituary

1905 births
1997 deaths
Australian archaeologists
Australian anthropologists
20th-century archaeologists
20th-century anthropologists
People from New South Wales
Identical twins
Australian twins
Australian people of English descent
Australian people of Scottish descent